Christos Arkoudas (born 13 June 1990) is a Greek professional footballer who plays as a defender.

Career 
The right back started his career in the youth side for AEK Athens F.C. and joined in summer 2007 to Kallithea F.C. After one year left Kallithea and joined on loan for the 2008/2009 season to Beta Ethniki club AO Thiva. He returned in May 2009 to Kallithea and played for the until June 2012 in 49 matches. On 17 July 2012 returned to his youth club AEK Athens F.C. and signed a four years contract.
In November 2013 Arkoudas signed a contract with Superleague Greece club Atromitos.

Doping case 
On 8 February 2013 the defender was banned by the Greek Football Federation after a positive drug test. On 19 February 2013 Arkoudas apologised to the Greek Football Federation and his 3 years ban dropped to a 3 months ban.

References

External links

1990 births
Living people
Kallithea F.C. players
AEK Athens F.C. players
Atromitos F.C. players
Super League Greece players
Doping cases in association football
Greek sportspeople in doping cases
Association football defenders
Footballers from Athens
Greek footballers